Ozzfest: 10th Anniversary is a DVD/CD set covering Ozzfest 2005.

Track listing

DVD track listing
Intro
"Caught in a Mosh" - Anthrax
In the Beginning
"A Gunshot to the Head of Trepidation" - Trivium
The Ozzfest Tour Machine
"Blind Eye Halo" - Soilwork
The Early Morning Gig?
"Bury Your Dead" - The Haunted
The Second Stage
"Voice of Sanity" - Gizmachi
Rob Zombie on the Second Stage
"More Human than Human" - Rob Zombie
The Ghosts of Ozzfest
Where the &#$@ did Heavy Metal Come In?
"You Can't Handle" - Wicked Wisdom
"From the Sun?" - Shelter
"A Threnody for Modern Romance" - It Dies Today   
The Original Lunatic
"Soul on Fire" - HIM
Just to Play?
"Awake and Lifeless" - A Dozen Furies
A Shot in the Dark
"Dragula" - Rob Zombie
Look At Us Now
"Sucker Train Blues" - Velvet Revolver 
The Psychometry of Black Sabbath
"War Pigs" - Black Sabbath
"Iron Man" - Black Sabbath
Ozzy Reflections
"Paranoid" - Black Sabbath

CD track listing
"Caught in a Mosh" - Anthrax (5:22)
"A Gunshot to the Head of Trepidation" - Trivium (5:46)
"Blind Eye Halo" - Soilwork (2:29)
"Bury Your Dead" - The Haunted (3:08)
"The End Is Here" - Alter Bridge* (5:28)
"Pulse" - The Mad Capsule Markets* (3:29)
"More Human than Human" - Rob Zombie (4:09)
"1985" - Bowling For Soup* (3:07)
"Soul on Fire" - HIM (4:03)
"Dragula" - Rob Zombie (3:53)
"Sucker Train Blues" - Velvet Revolver (4:42)
"War Pigs" - Black Sabbath (7:57)
"Iron Man" - Black Sabbath (7:47)
"Paranoid" - Black Sabbath (4:38)

 * - Bonus track

External links 
 
 

2005 live albums
2005 compilation albums
Live video albums
2005 video albums
Ozzfest